Reema Debnath is an Indian actress. She is known for her performances in the film Bodyguard, playing a supporting artist role named Savitha in the film, and Rajkumar Hirani directed film PK.

She started her acting career as a student of the Kolkata Film and Television Institute. She is a member of Cine & TV Artist Association CINTAA, Mumbai.

Life and education 
Debnath was born in Agartala, Tripura. Her father, Surendra Debnath is a retired civil servant and her mother, Hiran Bala Debnath is a homemaker. Reema Debnath did her schooling from Kendriya Vidyalaya and did post-graduation in Management from Kolkata. Later, she studied and performed in the Kolkata Film & Television Institute (KFTI). She joined a theatre named Nalini Kalamanch in Mumbai and started getting offers in TV serials, advertisement and films, both Hindi and regional.

She married Subrata Debnath in July 2007. Two years later, her husband initiated ex-parte divorce proceedings. During the same proceedings, Reema was declared dead by Mumbai High Court Judge Justice R C Chavan. The very next day, the judge assured that it was a 'typographical' error and the stenographer changed the order right away.

Acting career 
She is a member of Cine & TV Artist Association (CINTAA), Mumbai. She has worked for various TV Shows including Jai Shri Krishna, Colors and Chandramukhi, DD1. A few Episodes from Kaala Saaya for 9X, CID for Sony, Aahat for Zee, Jyoti for NDTV Imagine. A few ads like Zen Mobile in 2010, Nokia ringtone in 2008, Teleshopping (2008 and 2009) etc. Films like Aloy Phera (Bengali, 2005), Sindoor Daan, Dulha Albela, Daraar in (Bhojpuri language in 2008 and 2009), Bodyguard in (Hindi language in 2011) and PK (film) in 2014, Hindi Film By Rajkumar Hirani.

Filmography

Feature films

Television

Documentary

References

External links
 
 

Living people
21st-century Indian actresses
Actresses in Hindi cinema
Indian film actresses
Actresses from Mumbai
Actresses from Tripura
People from Agartala
Kendriya Vidyalaya alumni
Year of birth missing (living people)
21st-century Bengalis
Tripuri actors